Ramakrushna Nanda (15 February 1906 – 28 October 1994) was an Indian writer, educator and author of children's literature. He composed the song Ahe Dayamaya Biswa Bihari, a favourite of Mahatma Gandhi when Gandhi was at Sabarmati Ashram. This song was included in his Odia-language textbook Sahitya Sopana.

Biography

Family
Nanda's father was Madhusudan Nanda (d. 1892). His mother died in 1951. In 1925, Nanda married Soudamini Devi (d. 13 August 1988). They had eight daughters and one son. Nanda's elder brother was Balakrushna Nanda (teacher) and younger brothers were Radhakrushna Nanda (an eminent Drama writer cum artist and owner of Ichhapur Jatra Mandali, writer of many drama books and Niyati songs) and Dinakrushna Nanda.

His son is Er Prabhat Kumar Nanda, a retired Chief Engineer (RWSS). His daughter-in-law is Smt Anasuya Nanda, who is an eminent writer and singer. She is the editor of the Odia Children's magazine Sansar (founded by Ramakrushna Nanda).

Education
Nanda was born at Bairoi village of Cuttack District in Odisha and educated in the village of Kantapada, and at the Revenshwa collegiate school, Cuttack. He wrote for a school magazine, Chandrika. At the time of Independence of India, Nanda was inspired by a local leader, Gopobandhu and became a Swecha Sebaka, a volunteer. He stayed in Alkasrama,until continuing his studies at Satybadi Jatiya Bidyalaya, where he learnt Devnagiri, a type of Indian alphabet. Nanda also matriculated from the English medium school and later received a bachelor of education.

Career
Nanda began his career as a teacher at Banki school. He was then, for six years, an assistant teacher at Baripada high school. In 1933, Nanda became a social worker. He began a local welfare organization called Narayan Samiti. He was also a headmaster at Bhingarpur high school.

Writing
Nanda's first textbook in the Odia language was Sahitya Sopana. In 1946, he left his job and came back to Cuttack. On 21 July 1947, Nanda opened Parijata press. In August 1952, he began the Sansar magazine. The press closed in 1961. In retirement, Nanda wrote children's books and songs. Of the form nanabaya, (nonsense rhyme), Nanda said,"
"Unintelligibility or irrelevance does not reduce the value of nanbaya. The rhythm and style is unique. Sometimes the meanings are unclear or impossible to ascertain. In English, some of these rhymes are called 'nonsense' or meaningless rhymes. By defying the metrical prescriptions and grammatical conventions, the spontaneity of these rhymes endear themselves to children."

Lyricist
Nanda's lyrics for Aahe Dayamaya Bishwa Bihari and Holi Holi Re Holi Ranga Rangeli Nali. were used in the 1978 film, Balidaan .

Bibliography

 1930 – Tulsidas
 1931 – Tulsidas Dohabali
 1933 – Pratidhwani
 1934 – 37 – Sahitya Sopana
 1938 – Sahitya Bodha
 1940 – Rachna Darpana
 1944 – 45 – Patha Sopana
 1936–46 – Sangram O Sadhana (Part 1 and Part 2)
 1948 – Don Quixoti ( Translation )
 1949 – Bigyanara Kuhuka
 1962 – Biswa Parichaya (Oriya Bhasa Kosha)
 1969 – Jibana Taranga.
 1975 – Jhumuka
 1977–84 – Chaati Gacha series (Athara Phula, Kodie Phula, Baisi Phula, Teisi Phula, Chabisi Phula, Subarna Seu, Marana Doli, Sagara Kanya)
 1982 – Oriya Sishu sahitya and sangita Sankalana
 1982 – Prakurtira Galpapuri
 1982 – Indradhanu (translation)
 1983 – Ama Bana Jangala Katha (translation)
 1983 – Ama Sarira (translation)
 1984 – Suna Pahacha
 1984 – Ama Jatiya Pasu, Jatiya Pakhi
 1985 – Ama Jatiya Pataka O Jatiya Sangita, Jatiya Puspa O Jatiya Pratika
 1986 – Jibana Rahasya
 1988 – Ratna Pakhuda (Part 1 and Part 2)
 1989 – Satra Phula
 1989 – Adekha Banara Phula
 1989 – Pachatantra Kahani (Part 1, 2 and 3)
 1992 – Lekhanira Pathasala
 1993 – Bhabi Dekhantu
 1994 – Tuntunira Bahi
 1994 – Biswa Parichaya (2nd edition)

References

1906 births
1994 deaths
Indian children's writers
Indian male composers
Indian music educators
People from Cuttack district
Writers from Odisha
Odia-language writers
Recipients of the Odisha Sahitya Akademi Award
20th-century Indian composers
20th-century Indian writers
20th-century male musicians